Mark Lewis is an American hard rock/heavy metal music producer. Originally from the Southern Maryland area, he once lived the in Orlando, Florida area. Now Mark works as a producer, engineer, and mixer at his own studio in Nashville, Tennessee.

Lewis was a former producer at Audio Hammer Studios in Sanford, Florida. He has engineered productions and/or mixes for established artists such as Chimaira, Trivium, DevilDriver, The Black Dahlia Murder.

Discography

Studio albums

Compilations

EPs

Singles

Video albums

External links
Official MySpace page

Living people
Heavy metal producers
Place of birth missing (living people)
Year of birth missing (living people)
Record producers from Maryland